Hermannia is a genus of flowering plants in the mallow family, Malvaceae. It comprises at least 65 species with many more species as yet unresolved.

The genus commemorates Prof. Paul Hermann (1646-1695), a German professor of botany at Leyden and one of the first collectors to visit the Cape.

The genus has a large number of species, each with very limited distribution, but they are generally common and not threatened, with little interest shown in them for horticulture or medicine.

Their distribution ranges across Southern Africa, the vast majority of species being endemic. They are also found in Madagascar and in tropical East Africa to North East Africa and Arabia. A single species, Hermannia tigrensis, is found in western, southern and North-East Africa. Three species are found in northern Mexico and adjacent regions of the United States, one species in southern Mexico, and one in Australia. Hermannia'''s greatest diversity is found in the Western and Northern Cape, and Namibia.

Systematics

 Hermannia abrotanoides SCHRADER
 Hermannia althaeoides Link
 Hermannia auricoma K. Schum.
 Hermannia burchellii Verd.
 Hermannia cernua Thunb.
 Hermannia coccocarpa Kuntze
 Hermannia comosa Burch. ex DC.
 Hermannia confusa SALTER
 Hermannia cuneifolia Jacq.
 Hermannia damarana Baker f.
 Hermannia decumbens Willd. ex Spreng.
 Hermannia depressa N.E. Br.
 Hermannia diffusa L.f.
 Hermannia eenii Baker
 Hermannia elliottiana K. Schum.
 Hermannia engleri Schinz
 Hermannia erodioides Kuntze
 Hermannia exappendiculata (Mast.) K. Schum.
 Hermannia flammea Jacq.
 Hermannia gariepina Eckl. & Zeyh.
 Hermannia geniculata Eckl. & Zeyh.
 Hermannia gerrardii Harv.
 Hermannia glabrata L.f.
 Hermannia glanduligera K.Schum. ex Schinz
 Hermannia grandistipula (Buching. ex Harv.) K. Schum.
 Hermannia grossularifolia L.
 Hermannia heterophylla Thunb.
 Hermannia involucrata Cav.
 Hermannia johnstonii Exell & Mendonça
 Hermannia juttae Dinter & Engl.
 Hermannia lacera Fourc.
 Hermannia lancifolia Szyszyl.
 Hermannia linifolia Burm. f.
 Hermannia linnaeoides K. Schum.
 Hermannia modesta (Ehrenb.) Mast.
 Hermannia montana N.E. Br.
 Hermannia muricata Eckl. & Zeyh.
 Hermannia oblongifolia Hochr.
 Hermannia palmeri Vasey & Rose.
 Hermannia parviflora Eckl. & Zeyh.
 Hermannia pauciflora S. Watson
 Hermannia paucifolia Turcz.
 Hermannia pearsonii Exell & Mendonça
 Hermannia pfeilii K. Schum.
 Hermannia pinnata L.
 Hermannia pulchella L.f.
 Hermannia pulverata Andrews
 Hermannia quartiniana A.Rich.
 Hermannia rautanenii Schinz ex Schumann
 Hermannia repetenda Verd.
 Hermannia resedifolia R.A. Dyer
 Hermannia rigida Harv.
 Hermannia scabra Cav.
 Hermannia scordifolia Jacq.
 Hermannia setosa Schinz
 Hermannia sisymbriifolia Hochr.
 Hermannia spinosa E. Meyer ex Harvey
 Hermannia stellulata K. Schum.
 Hermannia stipitata Pillans
 Hermannia texana A. Gray
 Hermannia tigrensis Hochst. ex A.Rich.
 Hermannia tomentosa (Turcz.) Schinz ex Engl.
 Hermannia veronicifolia Hochr.
 Hermannia vestita Thunb.
 Hermannia violacea K. Schum.
 Hermannia viscosa'' Hiern

External links
 PlantZAfrica.com

Notes

References

Byttnerioideae
Malvaceae genera